Lauren McCrostie is a British actress.  She appeared in Miss Peregrine's Home for Peculiar Children, The Falling and short films Second Skin and Brothers.

Career
McCrostie attended Dulwich Village Infants' School, Dulwich Hamlet, The Charter School and St Marylebone School. McCrostie always had a passion for performing and as a child she would persuade her younger sister to perform with her and put on shows for their parents. McCrostie made her film debut when she auditioned for Carol Morley's film The Falling. Although McCrostie had no formal drama training, she was later cast as the character Gwen in Morley's film, alongside Maisie Williams, Florence Pugh and Greta Scacchi. After her role in The Falling, McCrostie hired an acting agent who secured auditions for appearances in short films and another with Tim Burton. Following an audition and meeting with Burton, McCrostie was cast as Olive Abroholos Elephanta in the film Miss Peregrine's Home for Peculiar Children, alongside Eva Green, Asa Butterfield, Ella Purnell and Samuel L. Jackson. In between her earlier acting jobs, McCrostie was waitressing at a cafe and went to drama classes at the Actors Centre. McCrostie became the ambassador for the Barnes Film Festival in 2017 which caters for young people looking for outlets to express their creativity in film and media.

Activism
McCrostie is an advocate for ethical and sustainable living and she has created a small online website which sells products made from re-purposed materials that would have otherwise been thrown away. A costume designer who worked with McCrostie on a short film, initially inspired McCrostie to only buy clothing from charity and vintage shops. McCrostie later learned about the destructive effect the fashion industry has on the environment and to humans, so she felt motivated to continue buying second-hand clothing to promote the idea of conscious consumption. The documentary The True Cost also inspired McCrostie to promote sustainability in the fashion industry.

McCrostie maintains an environmentally-friendly and sustainable lifestyle, and encourages her family to shop package free and to reduce the amount of plastic they consume as a household.

In November 2017, McCrostie became an ambassador for the New York based environmental organisation called Earth Angel which endeavours to reduce waste and harm to the environment on the sets of film, television, commercials and special events.

Personal life
McCrostie is a vegan.  McCrostie's paternal grandfather was born in Scotland and both her parents are from Kenya.
, McCrostie was living with her mother, who was working in radio, and younger sister in Dulwich in the UK.

Filmography

Film

Television

Theatre

References

External links
Lauren McCrostie Voice Samples
  
Lauren McCrostie's entertainer biography at United Agents UK

21st-century English actresses
Living people
English stage actresses
English film actresses
English people of Scottish descent
English people of Kenyan descent
Minimalist artists
People from Lambeth
Year of birth missing (living people)
20th-century English women
20th-century English people